Lortie is a French surname. Notable people with the surname include:

 Andrew Lortie, French theologian
 Bernard Lortie (born  1951), Canadian terrorist
 Denis Lortie (born 1959), Canadian spree killer
 Joseph Arthur Lortie (1869–1958), Canadian physician
 Léon Lortie (1902–1985), Canadian chemist
 Louis Lortie (born 1959), Canadian pianist
 Marc Lortie (born 1948), Canadian diplomat

French-language surnames